The Assize of Arms of 1181 was a proclamation of King Henry II of England concerning the obligation of all freemen of England to possess and bear arms in the service of king and realm and to swear allegiance to the king, on pain of "vengeance, not merely on their lands or chattels, but on their limbs". The assize stipulated precisely the military equipment that each man should have according to his rank and wealth. The assize effectively revived the old Anglo‐Saxon fyrd duty. The Assize established restrictions on weapon possession by Jews, terms of inheritance, and prohibition of exports of arms, ships and timber.

Text of the Assize of Arms
The Act reads as follows:

Background

Henry II came from a Norman line of kings and inherited the kingship of England which had fallen into Norman's hands after the Battle of Hastings in 1066.

England had been a unified nation for only a short time before this. It had been successfully invaded and conquered with military power from Roman Empire, with periodic incursions from Gaul, over about 400 years. This was followed by periodic waves of Viking invasions. It was not until the end of the first millennium that England had become unified by the conjoining of various local kingdoms and defeat of the many kingdoms in Northern and Eastern England paying Danegeld and having some ties (which became quite loose over time) to Viking kings on the continent. It is not clear cut who was the first King of England. Offa and Athelstan are strong candidates. History would have told Henry of the earlier Viking invasions along the North Sea, the English Channel (including Normandy) and the Irish Sea (Ireland and Wales). Because his immediate ancestors had themselves conquered England, he was well aware of the potential for external threats to his kingdom, as well as the more common risk of divided loyalties among those beneath him.

The Norman invasion of 1066 led to the introduction to England of a very structural form of feudalism. This was a strong social hierarchy with the king at its apex with most people owing fealty to another. The Norman and Viking armies had been very loose gatherings of fighting men, and looting and pillage was common among them, and therefore, as far as their kings were concerned, had only loose loyalties to them. Their armies did not match the power, might, and discipline of the Roman army that had been formed a thousand years earlier.

The power of the Norman kings ruling at that time in England was not founded on any form of standing army.  If a king needed to raise forces this would often have to be mercenary forces paid for by the king or his followers. The Assize of Arms needs to be seen in this context. Although it did not create a standing army in the modern sense, it did lay down conditions which would enable the King to call up a fighting force at any time which would be adequately armed to preserve the social order within the country and to ward off any external threat and did not require any formal form of taxation to achieve this.

Connection to the English and American Bills of Rights
Some in the United States have claimed that the Assize of Arms is an ancient right to bear arms, though this claim is disputed, noting that the Assize of Arms was an obligation, not a right (i.e., a choice). The Supreme Court of the United States ruling in District of Columbia v. Heller regarding the right to bear arms referred only to the English Bill of Rights of 1689 as precedent.

Some have asserted that the Assize of Arms is part of the legal basis for the English Bill of Rights and the right to keep and bear arms mentioned in the United States Bill of Rights (specifically in the Second Amendment to the United States Constitution).

The Assize of Arms did not describe an ancient legal or political individual right to arms, rather the Assize of Arms represented an imposed responsibility on subjects.

The Supreme Court of the United States in District of Columbia v. Heller was presented by the petitioners with written evidence that the Assize of Arms merely marked the beginning of the militia system in England. It claimed that a lower court's citation of the English Bill of Rights of 1689 as a source of a preexisting right had "misinterpreted it to guarantee a private right to possess guns, when it rather laid down the right of a class of citizens, Protestants, to take part in the military affairs of the realm. Nowhere was an individual’s right to arm in self-defense guaranteed." The court's final judgment on the right to bear arms concluded that the writers of the second amendment had intended to create such a right, based on the early settlers experience and on the English Bill of Rights. However, the court made no judgment on whether the right dated back to the Assize of Arms.

See also
 Assize of Arms of 1252
History of law enforcement in the United Kingdom
 Statute of Winchester (1285)

Notes

References

Stubbs, Select Charters, pp. 183 f. (Latin)
Full text at Google Books

English laws
Royal prerogative
Antisemitism in England
12th century in law
1181 in England